Below is a List of compositions by Zdeněk Fibich sorted by genre, Hud. number, opus number, date of composition, original and English titles.  Hud. numbers are from Zdeněk Fibich: Tematický katalog (Zdeněk Fibich: Thematic Catalogue) by Vladimír Hudec (Prague, 2001).

References 
 Zdeněk Fibich Souborné Vydání – Společnost Zdeňka Fibicha, Státní Nakladatelství Krásné Literatury, Hudba a Umění, Praha
 John Tyrrell and Judith A. Mabary, article in The New Grove Dictionary of Music & Musicians, p. 762-764, London, Macmillan 1980
 Pražská informační služba: Zdeněk Fibich
 Zdeněk Fibich: Průkopník moderního melodramu

Fibich, Zdenek
Fibich, Zdenek
Operas by Zdeněk Fibich